Karen Verhestraeten (born 23 April 1991) is a Belgian cyclist, who currently competes in cyclo-cross for UCI Cyclo-cross Team IKO–Crelan, and in road cycling for UCI Women's Continental Team . She represented her nation in the women's elite event at the 2016 UCI Cyclo-cross World Championships in Heusden-Zolder.

References

External links

1991 births
Living people
Cyclo-cross cyclists
Belgian female cyclists
Place of birth missing (living people)
People from Kasterlee
Cyclists from Antwerp Province